Shahar Marcus (born 1971) is an Israeli artist who works primarily in video, performance and installations.

Biography
Shahar Marcus was born in 1971 at Petach Tikva. His mother was a teacher and father a Diamond dealer. His first child was born during 2011 and in 2014 his youngest daughter joined the family. They currently reside in Tel Aviv, Israel.

In his early works Marcus dealt with the exploration of his own body and its limitations; his body serving as an instrument or rather a platform for the conducting of experiments with various perishable materials, such as dough, juice, ice and fire. While his early video-performances feature himself along with other artists, with whom he had collaborated in the past, in his recent works, Marcus appears by himself, while embodying different roles and characters.

His most recent works he deal with local political issues, by approaching iconic Israeli landmarks with a critical and humorous point of view (like "1,2,3,Herring"). Thus, Marcus reflects on his own heritage, environment and the creation of local historical narratives. He aspires to tackle a local issue, and convey it through universal visual means ("The Curator", "King of Falafel", "Homecoming Artist and Leap of Faith").

As of 2012, Marcus has been collaborating with the Turkish-German performance artist Nezaket Ekici. The both of them have been employing their own bodies as a medium to build up forces and energies, to resolve tensions and conflicts. By pushing their own physical limits, they cause their works to revolve in no small measure around the limits of cultural and political difference. (Methexis, Sand Clock, Salt Dinner).

Education 
1993‐1997 BA Linguistics, University of Tel Aviv 
1999‐2004 MA History of Art, University of Tel Aviv

Awards and residencies 
2015 The Discovery award, Loop art fair and festival,Barcelona,Spain.
2013	The Israeli Ministry of Culture award for Encouraging Creativity.
2013	Special mention for "seeds" at the 20 min\max film festival, Ingolstadt, Germany. 
2012	Winner of the "press" award, Laguna art prize, Venice,Italy 
2011	Winner of the celeste prize-video award 
2011	ArtMuse video festival, first place for "Freeze", Bocholt, Germany 
2010	Art OMI, New York City 
2009 	Special mention for "frog test" video art. The Jerusalem International Film festival, Israel. 
Jerusalem Film Festival, Experimental Cinema Award 
Naoussa Film Festival People's Choice Award 
2008	Beatrice Kolliner award for young artist, Israel Museum of Art 
2006	Young Artist Award, Ministry of Education And Culture

Solo exhibitions
2016 Artificial Islands, with Nezaket Ekici, Galeria Labirynt, Lublin, Poland 
2015 Going, Going Gone, Haifa Museum of Art, Haifa, Israel.
2015 Solid and soft, with Nezaket Ekici, DNA gallery, Berlin, Germany.
2015 "Fossils", with Nezaket Ekici, Petach Tikva Museum of Art, Petach Tikva, Israel
2014 "In Relation" with Nezaket Ekici, Saarbrücken, Germany
2014 "All is Gold", The Municipal Gallery, Rehovot, Israel
2013 "In Relation" with Nezaket Ekici, Siemens Sanat, Istanbul. Turkey
2013 "In Relation" with Nezaket Ekici, Artisterium VI, Tbilisi, Georgia 
2013 solo project at Threshold Gallery in "India art fair", New Delhi, India 
2012 1,2,3 Herring, MoCA Hiroshima, Hiroshima, Japan 
2011 The Curator, The Petach Tikva Museum of Art, Israel 
2011 The Memorial employee", Dana art Gallery, Kibbutz Yad Mordechai, Israel 
2010 Bread & Bunker, Mediations Biennale, Poznan, Poland 
2009 Bunkerbrot, MARS Gallery, Moscow biennale, Moscow, Russia 
2008 Bread & Bunker, G.D.K Gallery, Berlin 
2007 Salt & Ever, The Heder Gallery, Tel Aviv 
2005 Precise, Blurrr International Biennale, Kalisher, Tel Aviv 
To Be An Apprentice, Avni Institute of Art and Design, Jaffa 
2004 The Agency, Hakibbutz gallery, Tel Aviv

Group exhibitions

2016
Exhibition of works from the MOCAK at the MAXXI, Rome, Italy
The 9th Tbilisi Annual International Contemporary Art exhibition, Tbilisi History Museum, Tbilisi, Georgia 
VideoMedeja Festival, Novi Sad, Serbia 
5th Radial Festival, I.D. Festival Berlin, Berlin, Germany 
The Sea, Museum of Contemporary Art, Krakow, Poland
Urban Touch, Kunsthalle Faust, Hannover
Fundamental- the 5th Mediations Biennale, National Museum, Poznan, Poland 
The Pleasure of Love, The 56th October Salon, Belgrade Culture Center, Belgrade, Serbia 
Extremely Loud and Incredibly Close, Haifa Museum of Art, Haifa
Subspace, International Photography Festival, Tel-Aviv
Universum, International Photography Festival, Tel-Aviv
Medicine in Art, Museum of Contemporary Art, Krakow, Poland
Things to Come, Petach Tikva Museum of Art, Petach Tikva
Berlin Case, APT Art Gallery, Yekaterinburg, Russia
Torrance Art Museum (ArtVideoKOELN and the New Museum of Networked Art), Los Angeles, United States

2015
Shoot: about performance, DNA gallery, Berlin, Germany.
Recurrence, Nimac. Nicosia, Cyprus.
Re:Start – , Tel Aviv
Changing Perspectives – Haifa Museum of Art, Haifa
DNA Berlin Solid and Soft 
 Hospitalshof Stuttgart, Stuttgart Ich und Du

2014
Ekpharsis, Hermitage, Saint-Petersburg, Russia
In creation, Museum of Contemporary Art (MoCA), Taipei, Taiwan
The Winners, Haifa Museum of Art, Israel
Les Rencontres Internationales, Haus der Kulturen der Welt, Berlin, Germany 
Beyond, Galerie Maubert, Paris, France
Les Rencontres Internationales, Gaîté Lyrique (Palais de Tokyo), Paris, France

2013
WPA's Experimental Media 2013, The Phillips Collection, Washington D.C., United States. 
Faust Kunsthalle,"Schwerelos", Hannover, Germany. 
"The Compromised Land" Neuberger Museum of Art New York, New York, United States. 
Panorama Weserburg Museum of Modern Art, Bremen, Germany
The Wro Biennale, Wroclaw, Poland
Kino der Kunst, Munich, Germany
SAU Affero gallery, NJ, "Awards Images Moving and Art "Global

2012
The Mediations Biennale, Poznan, Poland 
The 2nd Ural Industrial Biennale of Contemporary Art, Yekaterinburg, Russia 
Afterwards, Total Museum, Seoul, Korea
Laguna art prize, Arsenale, Venice, Italy 
Middle East Europe, Dox Gallery, Prague, Czech Republic

2011
Art is Art is Art, Moscow Museum of Modern Art, Moscow, Russia 
The Museum, Presents Itself, Tel Aviv Museum of Art, Tel Aviv, Israel 
Nord Art international exhibition, Büdelsdorf, Germany 
Spring Exhibition, Kunsthal Charlottenborg, Copenhagen, Denmark

2010
As I remember, Kunstraum und Ateliers, Dresden, Germany 
Celeste prize finalists, The Invisible Dog, New York City, United States
The Meaning of Windows, Israel Museum youth wing, Jerusalem, Israel 
Israeli Video, Haifa Museum of Art, Israel 
Trembling Time, TATE Modern, London – Screenings program dedicated to recent video art from Israel, Curators: Stuart Komer and Sergio Edelsztein 
The Calm Before the Storm, Winzavod, Moscow

2009
3rd Moscow Biennale, Moscow, Curator: Irena Yshkova 
Nuit Blanch, Paris, France, Curator: Marie Shek 
Tina b Festival of Art, Prague 
FUSO International Video Art Annual of Lisbon, Lisbon, Portugal 
Naoussa International Film Festival, Greece
Athens Video Art Festival 2009, Athens, Greece
Performance Evening, Israel Museum Sculpture Garden, Jerusalem, curator: Amitai Mendelson

2008
Real Thing, Tel Aviv 
Wa(h)re Kunst, Concent art e.V. Gallery, Berlin, Germany
First Show, Contemporary Art from the Israel Museum, Mani House, Tel Aviv 
EPAF 2008, European Performance Art Festival, Warsaw
Freeze, Israel Museum, Real Time Art in Israel 1998–2008, Jerusalem, Israel

2007
Homecoming Artist, Magmart I video under volcano, Naples, Italy 
Homecoming Artist, 700.is, Egilsstadir, Iceland 
Rites & Rituals, Herzliya Museum of Contemporary Art, Herzliya 
A Quest from Sea to Sea, video, Israel Museum youth wing, Jerusalem 
Homecoming Artist, video, exhibition for awards winners by the Ministry of Education And Culture, Petach Tikva Museum of Art, Petach Tikva, Israel

2006
Cover, Galataperform, Istanbul, Turkey
Gefilte tish, Israel Museum youth wing, Jerusalem

2005
Precise, Blur 5 International Biennale for Performance Art, Tel Aviv 
Cover, L.M.P Theatre, C.R.A.N.E Art Tulage, Chateau de Chevigny, France

2003
Freeze, Blur 4 International Biennale for Performance Art, Jaffa 
Soak Art Focus 4, Jerusalem

Gallery

Articles 
 HA'ARETZ – GUIDE, 2 April 2010
 City Mouse, 27 May 2010
 "Tel Aviv", TIME OUT – Fresh Paint, 29 April 2010
 ISLAND CHANNEL, HAARETZ-FRONT, 17 August 2010
 BELLEMODE, 1 September 2010
 "Tower of Babel", Pnai Plus, 28 September 2010
 THE JERUSALEM POST – METRO, 15 October 2010
 Yediot Hanegev, 12 November 2010

References

External links 
Shahar Marcus, (home page)
ArtFacts

 

Israeli performance artists
Israeli artists
Living people
1971 births